Muhammet Hanifi Akagündüz (born January 11, 1978 in Bingöl), nicknamed Aka, is a Turkish-born Austrian footballer.

Akagündüz moved with his family to Austria in 1987 and he naturalised three years later.

Club career
His career has seen the much-travelled Aka play for FK Austria Wien, SV Gerasdorf, St. Pölten, VfB Admira Wacker Mödling, SV Ried, Malatyaspor, Konyaspor, Rapid Wien, Kayserispor and Hellas Verona.

International career
Internationally, Akagündüz has only represented the Austria national football team, having decided to play for his naturalised country rather than that of his birth. He made his debut for Austria in October 2002 against Belarus and has earned 10 caps, scoring one goal. His final international game was a February 2007 friendly match against Malta in which he came on as a late substitute for Roland Linz.

National team statistics

International goal
Scores and results list Austria's goal tally first.

References

External links
 Player profile - SV Ried
 Player profile - Austria Archive
 Rapid stats - Rapid Archive
 
 

1978 births
Living people
Austrian footballers
Austria international footballers
Austrian people of Turkish descent
FC Admira Wacker Mödling players
SV Ried players
Malatyaspor footballers
Konyaspor footballers
SK Rapid Wien players
Kayserispor footballers
Hellas Verona F.C. players
Manisaspor footballers
Austrian Football Bundesliga players
Serie B players
Süper Lig players
TFF First League players
Expatriate footballers in Italy
Turkish emigrants to Austria
Association football forwards